Splinter is the seventh studio album by American punk rock band the Offspring, released on December 9, 2003, by Columbia Records. It was the first album the band released without long-time drummer Ron Welty, who was fired before the recording sessions.

Although not as successful as the Offspring's previous albums, Splinter received gold certification two months after its release. The album received average reviews, but still sold reasonably well, debuting at number 30 on the US Billboard 200 with around 87,000 copies sold in its first week. "Hit That" and "(Can't Get My) Head Around You" were the only two singles to accompany the album; "Spare Me the Details" was also released as a single, but charted only in New Zealand.

Production and marketing
After spending nearly two years supporting the Conspiracy of One album, The Offspring began writing songs for Splinter in late 2002.

The recording sessions for the album lasted from January to August 2003, making it the first time The Offspring had recorded an album for that long (although their next album, 2008's Rise and Fall, Rage and Grace, took more than a year to record).

Three weeks prior to the recording sessions, longtime drummer Ron Welty, who had played on all six of the band's previous albums, left the Offspring to pursue his own band, Steady Ground, but it was later revealed he was fired by Dexter and Noodles "without prior notice." Welty filed a lawsuit against the band in September 10, 2020 for unpaid royalties.

Due to the difficulty in finding, or auditioning, for an immediate replacement for Welty on such short notice, the band elected to have session musician Josh Freese - who they met when his band The Vandals was signed by Dexter Holland's label Nitro Records, and happened to be in town right as they would start recording - play drums on the album. Holland noted Freese "did all the drums in just a couple days, and he made it sound like the Offspring, not A Perfect Circle or anything else he does." After the album was finished, Atom Willard was hired to be their tour drummer.

Splinter offers a variety of lyrical and musical themes, combining their usual punk rock with experiments into ska and electronic sounds, and  comedic songs with heavier themes about fear, paranoia, hopelessness and anxiety. Holland said that “Half this record is pretty much fast, melodic, whatever, punk stuff. But you kind of get bored just doing that after a while. I do.", and also that given most groups are "either a happy band or they're dark", he felt only one side did not fully represent him, "so I really wanted to do both in my music." A case of the mixture was lead single "Hit That", with lyrics about promiscuity creating broken families, with funk-inspired keyboards played by Ronnie King. The lyrics of "Spare Me the Details" were inspired by how a friend of Holland did not like being given a detailed account on how his girlfriend cheated on him.

The crowd vocals in the opening track "Neocon" were recorded at Reading Festival in 2002 during the Offspring's set on the festival's main stage.

There was another song recorded for the album, called "Pass Me By". The band felt that it was too heavy for Splinter, which is why it was not included on the disc.

Album title
On April Fools' Day 2003, the album's title was jokingly announced as Chinese Democracy, the same name of a repeatedly delayed album by Guns N' Roses. Holland quipped, "You snooze, you lose. Axl ripped off my braids, so I ripped off his album title." Holland detailed someone actually suggested Chinese Democracy as the band struggled to think of an album title and instead was saying comedic suggestions like Offspring Bloody Offspring, and that Guns N' Roses considered legal actions but were deterred by how album titles cannot be copyrighted before release. Regarding the name Splinter, which appears in a lyric of "Long Way Home", Holland explained that it reflected how "this record is pretty diverse and splintered", exploring different genres, while also having lyrics "told in first person through these different voices that are slightly demented like a splintered personality."

Track listing

Enhanced version
The Enhanced CD portion of the CD contains the following:
 Da Hui Video
 Da Hui Video (with Audio Commentary)
 Demo Studio Tour
 4 wallpapers
 2 MP3 tracks:

Critical reception

Similar to Conspiracy of One, has been given a score of 60 out of 100 from Metacritic based on "mixed or average reviews".

Reviewers from sites such as Launch.com claimed Splinter was a welcome return to The Offspring's punk roots, citing songs such as "The Noose" and "Da Hui". The more mainstream songs, "Hit That" and "Spare Me the Details", were also praised.

AllMusic's Johnny Loftus also praised punk songs such as "Long Way Home" and "Lightning Rod", and claimed second single "Head Around You" was the album's standout. However, he criticized songs such as "The Worst Hangover Ever" and "When You're in Prison", calling them 'throwaways'. PopMatters also praised "Head Around You", "Race Against Myself", and other heavier songs on the album. However, it also called "Worst Hangover Ever" 'idiotic' and again criticized "When You're In Prison" and "Neocon". They also criticized the album’s short length, calling it “wasted potential".

In 2017, Loudwire ranked Splinter as the weakest album in the entire Offspring catalogue.

Personnel

The Offspring
 Dexter Holland – lead vocals, rhythm guitar
 Noodles – lead guitar, backing vocals
 Greg K. – bass, backing vocals

Additional musicians
 Josh Freese – drums
 Ronnie King – keyboards on "Hit That"
 Jim Lindberg – backing vocals
 Jack Grisham – backing vocals
 Chris "X-13" Higgins – backing vocals
 2002 Reading Festival Crowd – crowd vocals on "Neocon"
 Mark Moreno – DJ scratching on "The Worst Hangover Ever"
 Phil Jordan – trumpet on "The Worst Hangover Ever"
 Jason Powell – saxophone on "The Worst Hangover Ever"
 Erich Marbach – trombone on "The Worst Hangover Ever"
 Brendan O'Brien – piano on "Spare Me the Details"
 Lauren Kinkade – backing vocals on "When You're in Prison"
 Natalie Leggett, Mario De Leon, Eve Butler, Denyse Buffum, Matt Funes – violins on "When You're in Prison"
 Josefina Vergara - concert master on "When You're in Prison"
 Suzie Katayama - orchestration on "When You're in Prison"
 Larry Corbett – cello on "When You're in Prison"
 Gayle Levant – harp on "When You're in Prison"

Production
 Brendan O'Brien - producer, mixing
 Billy Bowers - engineer
 Nick DiDia - assistant engineer
 Brian Humphrey - assistant engineer
 Phil Martin - assistant engineer
 Kevil Mills - assistant engineer
 Jamie Sickora - assistant engineer
 Karl Egsieker - assistant engineer
 Bryan Cook - assistant engineer
 Steve Masi - guitar technician
 Eddy Schreyer - mastering
 Bernie Grundman - mastering

Artwork
 Sean Evans - art direction
 Justin Beope - CD Art Adaption
 Sarkis Kaloustian - CD Art Adaption
 Rupert Truman - photography
 Storm Thorgerson - design
 Peter Curzon - design
 Darrell Lance Abbott - design

Charts and certifications

Weekly charts

Monthly charts

Year-end charts

Certifications

References

Notes

Sources

External links

 Splinter at YouTube (streamed copy where licensed)
 Official page for the album
 

The Offspring albums
2003 albums
Albums with cover art by Storm Thorgerson
Columbia Records albums
Albums produced by Brendan O'Brien (record producer)
Albums recorded at Henson Recording Studios